Spiranthes diluvialis is a rare species of orchid known as Ute lady's tresses (also, Ute ladies'-tresses). The species name diluvialis means "of the flood". It is native to the western United States, where there are scattered, mostly small occurrences in the states of Colorado, Idaho, Montana, Nebraska, Nevada, Utah, Washington, and Wyoming. An occurrence was recently discovered in southern British Columbia. The plant faces a number of threats to its existence. It is a federally listed threatened species of the United States.

Taxonomy
Specimens of this orchid were first collected in 1856 and have been labeled with the names of several species, including Spiranthes romanzoffiana, S. cernua, and S. porrifolia before the plant was finally described as a new species in 1984. Morphological and genetic analysis suggest that the orchid is of ancient hybrid origin between S. romanzoffiana and S. magnicamporum and is tetraploid, with four sets of chromosomes resulting from the combination of a pair from each parent species.

Description
It is a perennial terrestrial orchid with an erect stem growing 20 to 62 centimeters in height. The narrow lance-shaped leaves are arranged around the base of the stem and are up to 28 centimeters in length. The inflorescence is a spiral of many flowers on a stalk coated in glandular hairs. The flower has narrow white or ivory-colored petals. Blooming occurs in July and August, and sometimes into September, and October. The plant reproduces sexually by seed and vegetatively by sprouting from broken-off pieces of root. The seeds are so small they are like dust; one plant can produce 100,000 individual seeds. Like other orchids, this species depends on mycorrhizal fungi to help the seeds germinate. The flowers are pollinated by bees of genus Anthophora, especially Anthophora terminalis, as well as bumblebees (Bombus spp.).

Habitat
This plant grows in moist wetland habitat, including bogs and riparian areas such as riverbanks, floodplains, lakeshores, riverside woodlands and forest, desert springs, and meadows, and human-made habitat such as ditches, reservoirs, and irrigated agricultural settings. In 2005 there were about 52 occurrences. The population size is difficult to count or estimate because the plant spends most of its time in a vegetative or dormant state, in which there are few or no aboveground plant parts and these may be hidden in dense surrounding vegetation or hard to identify. Some plants may be dormant underground for years at a time. What appear on paper to be larger populations are actually areas that have been more often and intensely surveyed.

Conservation
Threats to this species include habitat loss and degradation via many processes. Urban development has led to the extirpation of a number of populations, including some within the Salt Lake City and Colorado Springs metropolitan areas. It continues to be a threat in many areas, including the vicinity of Boulder, Colorado. Threats associated with urban development include the introduction of weeds into the habitat and the loss of pollinating insects. Construction and maintenance of roads and other infrastructure, such as dams and pipelines, damages habitat. Recreational activities in the plant's riparian habitat, such as boating and off-road vehicle use, can be damaging. Some populations grow in irrigated fields and are susceptible to mowing and other farm activity, and the conversion to agricultural use consumes natural areas. As much as 65% of the plant's known habitat is affected by cattle and horse grazing; this can be harmful but it may also be beneficial in some ways, especially if the animals eat competing weeds. The orchid grows in wetland habitat, which is degraded by any process that alters the local hydrology; one estimate had 52% of all individuals in areas threatened by hydrological change. Water is diverted for irrigation and municipal use. The orchid grows in flood-prone river habitat and flood suppression via levees and other structures affects and prevents this natural process. River restoration activities have been known to negatively affect orchid populations that have become established or re-established in previously altered river habitat.

Invasive species of plants considered threats include redtop (Agrostis stolonifera), musk thistle (Carduus nutans), spotted knapweed (Centaurea maculosa), Russian knapweed (Acroptilon repens), creeping thistle (Cirsium arvense), Fullers teasel (Dipsacus fullonum), oleaster (Elaeagnus angustifolia), quickgrass (Elytrigia repens), leafy spurge (Euphorbia esula), peppergrass (Lepidium latifolium), purple loosestrife (Lythrum salicaria), reed canary grass (Phalaris arundinacea), sow thistle (Sonchus arvensis), and saltcedar (Tamarix chinensis).

This plant grows in many types of habitat reliant on natural cycles of disturbance, such as flooding and occasional wildfire. Without these processes, the habitat becomes overgrown and large and woody vegetation types move in as ecological succession causes overall change. When flooding is controlled and fire suppression is implemented, the orchid may face inadequate conditions, such as too much shade or thick layers of built-up leaf litter.

Other threats include herbivory by native animals such as bighorn sheep, voles, and rabbits. The loss of pollinating bees is a threat, as is the loss of other wildflowers that attract the bees. Other documented threats include drought, pesticides, pollution, and poaching.

References

External links 
 Spiranthes diluvialis. University of Washington Burke Museum.

diluvialis
Orchids of Canada
Orchids of the United States
Flora of Colorado
Flora of Idaho
Flora of Montana
Flora of Nebraska
Flora of Nevada
Flora of Utah
Flora of Washington (state)
Flora of Wyoming
Flora of British Columbia
Plants described in 1984